Volodymyr Serhiyovych Reva (born 25 September 1958) is a professional Ukrainian football coach and a former defender.

During 2015–2018 he served as a head coach of the Ukraine women's national football team.

References

External links

1958 births
Living people
People from Zhmerynka
Ukrainian footballers
Association football defenders
FC Frunzenets-Liha-99 Sumy players
FC Dnipro Cherkasy players
Ukrainian football managers
Ukrainian expatriate football managers
Expatriate football managers in Moldova
Expatriate football managers in Belarus
FC Nyva Vinnytsia managers
FC Tiraspol managers
FC Kovel-Volyn Kovel managers
FC Dynamo Khmelnytskyi managers
FC Skala Stryi (2004) managers
Ukraine women's national football team managers
Sportspeople from Vinnytsia Oblast